de Passe Jones Entertainment (dJE)  is an American entertainment content provider led by Suzanne de Passe and Madison Jones that sources, develops, acquires, and produces a variety of television, motion picture, theater, new media, and print content.

History
In 1989, Berry Gordy sold Motown Productions to Suzanne de Passe, who renamed it to de Passe Entertainment. As dPE, the company produced such television shows and feature films as Class Act, Sister, Sister, Smart Guy, and Showtime at the Apollo. In 2008, Suzanne de Passe joined with veteran producer Madison Jones to form de Passe Jones Entertainment which is headquartered in Los Angeles, California.

Productions
In 2009, dJE produced President Barack Obama's Commander in Chief's Inaugural Ball.

See also
Madison Jones
Suzanne de Passe
de Passe Entertainment

References

External links 
 de Passe Jones Company Website

Entertainment companies based in California
Companies based in Los Angeles
Entertainment companies established in 2008
2008 establishments in California